The men's 4 x 100 metres relay at the 1934 European Athletics Championships was held in Turin, Italy, at the  Stadio Benito Mussolini on 9 September 1934.

Medalists

Results

Final
9 September

Participation
According to an unofficial count, 16 athletes from 4 countries participated in the event.  The fourth member of the Italian relay team is unknown.

 (4)
 (4)
 (4)
 (4)

References

4 x 100 metres relay
Relays at the European Athletics Championships